The Academy of Arts, Careers and Technology (AACT) is a career-tech high school in Reno, Nevada that is a part of the Washoe County School District.

Academies

The school is divided into seven different fields of study that students can pursue in their high school career. This allows for a wider academic reach and also provides insight into professional fields of work.

Business & Finance

 Computer Literacy
 Entrepreneurship
 Marketing
 Personal Finance
 Principles of Business & Marketing
 Work Experience - Business & Marketing

Communications Arts & Media

 Graphic Design I / II / III
 Photography
 Video Production I / II / III

Culinary & Hospitality

 Baking & Pastry I & II
 Culinary Arts I / II / III
 Hospitality Management I & II

Teaching and Training

 Human Development
 Teaching and Training I / II / III

Engineering & Renewable Energy

 Advanced Mechanical Principals & Design
 Drafting & Design I / II / III
 Intro to Metalworking
 Machine Tool Technology
 Mechanical Principals & Design
 Metalworking
 Welding Technology I & II

Medical Careers

 Emergency Medical Service 
 Health Occupations I & II
 Health Science
 Emergency Medical Technician
 Medical Terminology

Natural Resources and Animal Science

 Agriculture I & II
 Horticulture Science 
 Greenhouse Management 
 Natural Resources & Wildlife Management
 Veterinary Sciences
 Agricultural Business

Campus
AACT has a small campus on Edison Way near the Reno-Tahoe International Airport and KTVN Channel 2 News CBS, and occupies a two-story "green" building with a unique architectural design. The older half of the building is circular with each classroom having one glass wall and facing the center of the circle. The new addition to the building is 46,000 square feet with an operational bank, restaurant, bakery, and three-part commercial kitchen. The new addition also contains two physical education classrooms, a business classroom and a horticulture/vet med classroom with a fully functional green house including an animal pen. The old wing contains multiple medical classrooms, with a simulation hospital room. Also in the old wing is a two sided broadcast studio, with a classroom side, and a studio side with two lighting set-ups. The broadcast studio can also be turned into a still image studio and a green screen set for virtual news sets and special effect films.

Extracurricular activities

Athletics

Although the Academy does not have sports teams of their own, students have the ability to participate in sports at their zoned high school. However, transportation is the responsibility of the parent and/or student. Currently, approximately 15% of the student body at the Academy participates in football, basketball, soccer, track, cross country, cheerleading, swimming or baseball at their zoned high schools.

Career & Technical Student Organizations (CTSO)

The Academy of Arts, Careers and Technology is active in SkillsUSA, HOSA and FFA. All Academy students participate in a (CTSO) affiliated with their academy. Through their academy and CTSO, students are eligible for leadership and officer positions, as well as participating in competitions and camps.

 FFA
 Natural Resources & Animal Sciences
 HOSA
 Medical Careers
 SkillsUSA
 Business & Finance
 Communications, Arts & Media
 Culinary & Hospitality
 Engineering & Renewable Energy
FCCLA
Teaching and Training
Business and Finance
Communications, Arts & Media
FBLA
Business and Finance

Service Learning and Capstone Project

The Academy is committed to connecting students to the community and helping them recognize and embrace their leadership capacity and civic responsibility. All students participate in meaningful service experiences throughout high school, culminating in a capstone project that addresses a community need utilizing their academic/skills knowledge. In total, students must complete a minimum of 66 hours by the end of their senior year.

History
The Academy of Arts, Careers and Technology, formerly known as The Regional Technical Institute (RTI), and Glenn Hare became a full-time four-year high school in the fall of 2009.

Ratings

The Academy of Arts, Careers and Technology was rated five stars in the Washoe County School District. This was one of two schools to receive this rating.

Academy of Arts, Careers and Technology currently has a 100% graduation rate for the class of 2017.

Inappropriate Student Relation Allegations
On May 17, 2018, Maren Oates, a Communications teacher at The Academy of Arts, Careers and Technology, was booked into county jail under "allegations that a District employee engaged in an inappropriate relationship with a student." She was placed on administrative leave and held on a $20,000 dollar bond at the Washoe County Jail.

References

External links
 
 

Public high schools in Nevada
Schools in Reno, Nevada
Washoe County School District